Law Ho Yin (born 13 September 1998) is a former Hong Kong professional footballer who played as a midfielder.

Club career
In July 2016, Law started his career with Hong Kong Second Division club Resources Capital, helping them achieve promotion to the Hong Kong top flight.

In 2019, he was appointed captain of Resources Capital.

On 11 December 2021, Law announced his retirement from professional football.

References

External links

  
 Law Ho Yin at playmakerstats.com

Hong Kong footballers
Hong Kong First Division League players
Hong Kong Premier League players
Living people
Association football midfielders
1998 births
Resources Capital FC players